Skenea diaphana is a species of sea snail, a marine gastropod mollusk in the family Skeneidae.

Description
The size of the shell attains 2.5 mm.
The thin shell is narrowly umbilicated. It has a depressed trochiform shape. It is translucent, white, smooth, and shining. The 3½ whorls are very convex with a deep suture. They are smooth, except twenty to twenty-five close spiral lines around the umbilical perforation.

Distribution
This species occurs in the Atlantic Ocean from Virginia, USA, to Brazil.

References

 Verrill, A. E. 1884. Second catalogue of Mollusca recently added to the fauna of the New England coast and the adjacent parts of the Atlantic, consisting mostly of deep-sea species, with notes on others previously recorded. Transactions of the Connecticut Academy of Arts and Sciences 6: 139–294

diaphana
Gastropods described in 1884